John Ireland Howe (July 20, 1793 – September 10, 1876) was an inventor and manufacturer. He was born in Ridgefield, Connecticut. Trained as a doctor, he worked as resident physician at the New York Almshouse. In 1828, after leaving that position, he invented and patented a process for preparing rubber compounds, but was unsuccessful in his attempt market the patent.

Howe had seen pins being made by manual process at the Alms House, and began work on a machine for making pins. He received a patent in 1832, and another (#2,013) in 1841.

Pins had long made by hand using division of labor, as famously described by Adam Smith in his The Wealth of Nations. Howe's innovation was to mechanize the entire process into one machine: a rotary table, its motion controlled by cams, moved the pins from one station to the next. An 1839 article described the process:

The apparatus . . . is one of the most ingenious and beautiful pieces of mechanism in the whole circle of the arts. It is impossible for me to give you any adequate description of it. Those who have any fondness for mechanical ingenuity must see it for themselves. Generally, I may state that the wire from which the pins are to be made is passed in at one end of the machine, cut in the requisite length, and passed from point to point, till the pins are headed and fitted for the process of silvering and putting up. The whole process may be distinctly seen, and as one pair of forceps hands the pin along to its neighbour, it is difficult to believe the machine is not an intelligent being.' 

Howe established the Howe Manufacturing Company in 1833 in New York City and moved it to Derby, Connecticut, in 1836. In 1839, three pin machines were in operation, producing 72,000 pins per day. In 1845 it employed 30 men and 40 women and produced pins worth $60,000.

Howe's machine-made pins were not, at first, cheaper than hand-made pins, and Howe fought to receive tariff protection to keep British pins out of the country.

He retired from manufacturing in 1865 and died in 1876. His grave is in Oak Cliff Cemetery in Derby. Howe's home on Caroline Street in Derby, Connecticut is listed on the National Register of Historic Places as John I. Howe House.

References

External links
Derby Hall of Fame: John I. Howe
Steven Lubar, "Culture and Technological Design in the 19th-Century Pin Industry: John Howe and the Howe Manufacturing Company" Technology and Culture, Vol. 28, No.2 (Apr., 1987),253-282.

1793 births
1876 deaths
19th-century American inventors
Derby, Connecticut